The Faisal–Weizmann Agreement was a 3 January 1919 agreement between Emir Faisal, the third son of Hussein ibn Ali al-Hashimi, King of the short-lived Kingdom of Hejaz, and Chaim Weizmann, a Zionist leader who had negotiated the 1917 Balfour Declaration with the British government, signed two weeks before the start of the Paris Peace Conference. Together with a letter written by T. E. Lawrence in Faisal's name to Felix Frankfurter in March 1919, it was one of two documents used by the Zionist delegation at the Peace Conference to argue that the Zionist plans for Palestine had prior approval of Arabs.

The agreement was presented to Faisal in his room at the Carlton Hotel on 3 January in English, which Faisal could not read, and its contents were explained to Faisal by Lawrence as the sole translator. Faisal signed the document in the same meeting, without consulting his advisors awaiting him in a separate room, but added a caveat in Arabic next to his signature, such that Faisal considered the agreement was conditional on Palestine being within the area of Arab independence. The Zionist Organization submitted the Agreement to the Paris Peace Conference without the caveat.

Yoav Gelber described the document as "of propaganda value only", since it quickly became clear that Faisal's conditions would not be met.

Background: status of Palestine
At the time the agreement was made, there had preceded it (apart from the Balfour Declaration) the McMahon-Hussein Correspondence, the Sykes-Picot Agreement, the Hogarth message, the Bassett Letter, the Declaration to the Seven and the Anglo-French Declaration. Of these, the Sykes-Picot Agreement had been made public by the Bolsheviks and the Declaration to the Seven as well as the Anglo-French Declaration were also public documents. The Sykes–Picot Agreement had called for an "Arab State or a Confederation of Arab States ... under the suzerainty of an Arab chief". The French and British also proposed an international administration in the "brown area" (an area including Jerusalem, similar to and smaller than Mandate Palestine), the form of which was to be decided upon after consultation with Russia, and subsequently in consultation with the other Allies, "and the representatives of the Shereef of Mecca".

Henry McMahon had exchanged letters with Faisal's father Hussein bin Ali, Sharif of Mecca in 1915, in which he had promised Hussein control of Arab lands with the exception of "portions of Syria" lying to the west of "the districts of Damascus, Homs, Hama and Aleppo". Palestine lies to the southwest of these areas and wasn't explicitly mentioned. That modern-day Lebanese region of the Mediterranean coast was set aside as part of a future French Mandate. After the war the extent of the coastal exclusion was hotly disputed. Hussein had protested that the Arabs of Beirut would greatly oppose isolation from the Arab state or states, but did not bring up the matter of Jerusalem or Palestine. Between 1916 and 1920, the British government interpreted these commitments as including Palestine in the Arab area. However, in the 1922 Churchill White Paper they argued instead that Palestine had been excluded.

On the basis of McMahon's assurances the Arab Revolt began on 5 June 1916. However, the British and French also secretly concluded the Sykes–Picot Agreement on 16 May 1916. This agreement divided many Arab territories into British- and French-administered areas and allowed for the internationalisation of Palestine. Hussein learned of the agreement when it was leaked by the new Russian government in December 1917, but was satisfied by two disingenuous telegrams from Sir Reginald Wingate, High Commissioner of Egypt, assuring him that the British government's commitments to the Arabs were still valid and that the Sykes-Picot Agreement was not a formal treaty.

Following the publication of the Balfour Declaration the British had dispatched Commander David George Hogarth to see Hussein in January 1918 bearing the message that the "political and economic freedom" of the Palestinian population was not in question. Hogarth reported that Hussein "would not accept an independent Jewish State in Palestine, nor was I instructed to warn him that such a state was contemplated by Great Britain". According to Isaiah Friedman, Hussein was not perturbed by the Balfour Declaration and on 23 March 1918, in Al Qibla, the daily newspaper of Mecca, attested that Palestine was "a sacred and beloved homeland of its original sons", the Jews; "the return of these exiles to their homeland will prove materially and spiritually an experimental school for their [Arab] brethren." He called on the Arab population in Palestine to welcome the Jews as brethren and cooperate with them for the common welfare. Whereas Kedourie (as well as Friedman) have argued that Hussein accepted the Balfour Declaration, Charles D.Smith has argued that both Friedman and Kedourie misrepresent documents and violate scholarly standards in order to reach their conclusions. while Schneer says that historians have spilled oceans of ink tracing the initial reactions of Hussein and his sons to the Balfour Declaration without settling the debate, noting that Hussein considered Palestine to be Arab land.

Continuing Arab disquiet over Allied intentions also led during 1918 to the British Declaration to the Seven and the Anglo-French Declaration, the latter promising "the complete and final liberation of the peoples who have for so long been oppressed by the Turks, and the setting up of national governments and administrations deriving their authority from the free exercise of the initiative and choice of the indigenous populations".

Prelude to the Agreement

Weizmann first met Faisal in June 1918, during the British advance from the South against the Ottoman Empire in World War I. As leader of an impromptu "Zionist Commission", Weizmann traveled to southern Transjordan for the meeting. Weizmann had assured Faisal that "the Jews did not propose to set up a government of their own but wished to work under British protection, to colonize and develop Palestine without encroaching on any legitimate interests". Antonius commented in 1938 that: "The combined effect of those assurances had been to induce in him a belief that there was nothing either in the Zionist aspirations as such or in the policy professed by the British Government in regard to their fulfilment that would interfere with Arab political and economic freedom in Palestine".

Weizmann's intended purpose was to forge an agreement between Faisal and the Zionist movement to support an Arab Kingdom and Jewish settlement in Palestine, respectively. The wishes of the Palestinian Arabs were to be ignored, and, indeed, both men seem to have held the Palestinian Arabs in considerable disdain. In the event, Weizmann and Faisal established an informal agreement under which Faisal would support close Jewish settlement in Palestine while the Zionist movement would assist in the development of the vast Arab nation that Faisal hoped to establish.

After concerns were expressed by Cecil regarding draft proposals put forward by the Advisory Committee on Palestine (chaired by Herbert Samuel), Balfour suggested to Weizmann that "it would be very helpful indeed if the Zionists and Feisal could act unitedly and reach an agreement on certain points of possible conflict'.Weizmann and Faisal met again on 11 December 1918, while both were in London preparing their statements for the upcoming peace conference in Paris.

Two weeks prior to signing the agreement, on 12 December 1918, Faisal was quoted in The Times, in a piece which Ali Allawi writes was "no doubt instigated by Lawrence and the Foreign Office":
The two main branches of the Semitic family, Arabs and Jews, understand one another, and I hope that as a result of interchange of ideas at the Peace Conference, which will be guided by ideals of self-determination and nationality, each nation will make definite progress towards the realization of its aspirations. Arabs are not jealous of Zionist Jews, and intend to give them fair play and the Zionist Jews have assured the Nationalist Arabs of their intention to see that they too have fair play in their respective areas. Turkish intrigue in Palestine has raised jealousy between the Jewish colonists and the local peasants, but the mutual understanding of the aims of Arabs and Jews will at once clear away the last trace of this former bitterness, which, indeed, had already practically disappeared before the war by the work of the Arab Secret Revolutionary Committee, which in Syria and elsewhere laid the foundation of the Arab military successes of the past two years.

Two days prior to the agreement, on 1 January 1919, Faisal's delegation submitted a statement to the Peace Conference, and a further memorandum was submitted on 29 January. The statement referred to the goal to "unite the Arabs eventually into one nation", defining the Arab areas as "from a line Alexandretta – Persia southward to the Indian Ocean" (1 January) or "from the line Alexandretta – Diarbekr southward to the Indian Ocean" (29 January). The latter memorandum described boundaries of any new states as "matters for arrangement between us, after the wishes of their respective inhabitants have been ascertained" in a reference to US President Woodrow Wilson's policy of self determination.

Agreement
They signed the written agreement, which bears their names, on 3 January 1919. Faisal was not explicitly authorised by his father to enter into such an agreement, with his instructions from his father limited to the requirement that he accept only fulfilment of the previous British promises for Arab independence; the caveat was added as a result. The next day, Weizmann arrived in Paris to head the Zionist delegation to the Peace Conference.

Text of the Agreement 
Agreement Between Emir Feisal and Dr. Weizmann

3 January 1919

His Royal Highness the Emir Feisal, representing and acting on behalf of the Arab Kingdom of Hedjaz, and Dr. Chaim Weizmann, representing and acting on behalf of the Zionist Organization, mindful of the racial kinship and ancient bonds existing between the Arabs and the Jewish people, and realizing that the surest means of working out the consummation of their natural aspirations is through the closest possible collaboration in the development of the Arab State and Palestine, and being desirous further of confirming the good understanding which exists between them, have agreed upon the following:

Articles:

Given under our hand at London, England, the third day of January, one thousand nine hundred and nineteen

Chaim Weizmann Feisal Ibn-Hussein

Main points of the agreement 
 The agreement committed both parties to conducting all relations between the groups by the most cordial goodwill and understanding, to work together to encourage immigration of Jews into Palestine on a large scale while protecting the rights of the Arab peasants and tenant farmers, and to safeguard the free practice of religious observances. The Muslim Holy Places were to be under Muslim control.
 The Zionist movement undertook to assist the Arab residents of Palestine and the future Arab state to develop their natural resources and establish a growing economy.
 The boundaries between an Arab State and Palestine should be determined by a Commission after the Paris Peace Conference.
 The parties committed to carrying into effect the Balfour Declaration of 1917, calling for a Jewish national home in Palestine.
 Disputes were to be submitted to the British Government for arbitration.

Weizmann signed the agreement on behalf of the Zionist Organization, while Faisal signed on behalf of the short-lived Arab Kingdom of Hedjaz.

Faisal's caveat
Faisal conditioned his acceptance on the fulfillment of British wartime promises to the Arabs, who had hoped for independence in a vast part of the Ottoman Empire. He appended to the typed document a hand-written statement, next to which Lawrence added a slightly inaccurate translation:

The date of 4 January referred to in the caveat is either a mistake or refers to a document unknown to historians. Allawi interprets Faisal as referring to his memorandum submitted on 1 January.

Subsequent discussions

Paris Peace Conference
Faisal submitted his written proposals to the Conference on 27 January. A draft memorandum that Lawrence had brought at Faisal's request to Stephen Bonsal of the American delegation shortly after the Zionists had made their initial presentation, according to Bonsal's memoirs, stated very different views from the agreement with Weizmann:
If the views of the radical Zionists, as presented to the Peace Conference, should prevail, the result will be a ferment, chronic unrest, and sooner or later civil war in Palestine. But I hope I will not be misunderstood. I assert that we Arabs have none of the racial or religious animosity against the Jews which unfortunately prevail in many other regions of the world. I assert that with the Jews who have been seated for some generations in Palestine our relations are excellent. But the new arrivals exhibit very different qualities from those "old settlers" as we call them, with whom we have been able to live and even co-operate on friendly terms. For want of a better word I must say that new colonists almost without exception have come in an imperialistic spirit. They say that too long we have been in control of their homeland taken from them by brute force in the dark ages, but that now under the new world order we must clear out; and if we are wise we should do so peaceably without making any resistance to what is the fiat of the civilised world.

Faisal made his appearance before the Supreme Council on 6 February and, in a further sign that his Zionist sympathy might be wavering, suggested that "Palestine, in consequence of its universal character, be left on one side for the mutual consideration of all parties concerned".

The Zionists written submission was made on 3 February with their appearance before the Supreme Council on 27 February.

Le Matin interview
A 1 March interview by Le Matin quoted Faisal as saying:
This feeling of respect for other religions dictates my opinion about Palestine, our neighbor. That the unhappy Jews come to reside there and behave as good citizens of this country, our humanity rejoices given that they are placed under a Muslim or Christian government mandated by The League of Nations. If they want to constitute a state and claim sovereign rights in this region, I forsee very serious dangers. It is to be feared that there will be a conflict between them and the other races.

Frankfurter correspondence

Although Allawi states that Faisal had been misquoted he says that the Le Matin interview resulted in difficulties with the Zionists leading to a meeting between Faisal and Frankfurter followed by Lawrence drafting of a letter to Felix Frankfurter, President of the Zionist Organization of America, on 3 March 1919, signed by Faisal:

"The Arabs, especially the educated among us, look with the deepest sympathy on the Zionist movement. Our deputation here in Paris is fully acquainted with the proposals submitted yesterday by the Zionist Organization to the Peace Conference, and we regard them as moderate and proper."

Frankfurter replied on 5 March "..These aims are now before the Peace Conference as definite proposals by the Zionist Organisation. We are happy indeed that you consider these proposals 'moderate and proper,' and that we have in you a staunch supporter for their realisation."

Controversy
When the letter was tabled at the Shaw Commission in 1929, Rustam Haidar spoke to Faisal in Baghdad and cabled that Faisal had "no recollection that he wrote anything of the sort". In January 1930, Haidar wrote to a newspaper in Baghdad that Faisal: "finds it exceedingly strange that such a matter is attributed to him as he at no time would consider allowing any foreign nation to share in an Arab country". Awni Abd al-Hadi, Faisal's secretary, wrote in his memoirs that he was not aware that a meeting between Frankfurter and Faisal took place and that: "I believe that this letter, assuming that it is authentic, was written by Lawrence, and that Lawrence signed it in English on behalf of Faisal. I believe this letter is part of the false claims made by Chaim Weizmann and Lawrence to lead astray public opinion." According to Allawi, the most likely explanation for the Frankfurter letter is that a meeting took place, a letter was drafted in English by Lawrence, but that its "contents were not entirely made clear to Faisal. He then may or may not have been induced to sign it", since it ran counter to Faisal's other public and private statements at the time.

Mack notes that Frankfurter reprinted the letter in the October 1930 issue of The Atlantic Monthly, vouched for its authenticity, commenting "Prince Feisal's letter was a document prepared under the most responsible conditions" and that although Faisal objected to interpretations that understood his letter to mean consent to Zionist policy, he did not disavow its authorship.

Failure of the Agreement

Syrian National Congress and Kingdom of Syria

In October 1918, British and Arab forces had captured Damascus during the Arab Revolt and Faisal formed a government. In May 1919, elections were held for the Syrian National Congress. On 2 July 1919 the Congress in a memorandum presented to the King-Crane Commission completely opposed any migration to Palestine and the latter not to be separated from Syria. According to C.D. Smith, the Syrian National Congress had forced Faisal to back away from his tentative support of Zionist goals. At this point, the Agreement could be seen as a dead letter. On 7 March 1920, Faisal was proclaimed King of Arab Kingdom of Syria (Greater Syria).

In April 1920, the San Remo conference gave France the mandate for Syria, which led to the Franco-Syrian War. In the Battle of Maysalun on 24 July 1920, the French were victorious and Faisal was expelled from Syria after which he contended that the conditions he appended were not fulfilled and the agreement therefore moot. According to contemporaries, including Gertrude Bell and Lawrence, the French, with British support, betrayed Faisal and the Arab cause rendering the treaty invalid.

Hussein's views
St. John Philby, a British representative in Palestine, later stated that Hussein bin Ali, the Sharif of Mecca and King of Hejaz, on whose behalf Faisal was acting, had refused to recognize the agreement as soon as it was brought to his notice.

Disclosure of the agreement
The agreement was first disclosed to the public in 1936.

It was noted by UNSCOP that "To many observers at the time, conclusion of the Feisal-Weizmann Agreement promised well for the future co-operation of Arab and Jew in Palestine", and further referring to the 1937 report of the Palestine Royal Commission which noted that "Not once since 1919 had any Arab leader said that co-operation with the Jews was even possible" despite expressed hopes to the contrary by British and Zionist representatives.
UNSCOP did not regard the agreement as ever being valid, although Weizmann asserted that the treaty should be considered valid while at the same time agreeing that Faisal had the right to void it after losing Syria to the French.

In popular culture
Faisal-Weizmann agreement is described in one stanza of the Urdu philosophical poetry book Bang-e-dara by Allama Iqbal (written in 1924).

See also 

 Israeli–Palestinian peace process
 List of Middle East peace proposals
 Projects working for peace among Israelis and Arabs

Notes

References

Sources

General references
 
 
 Weisgal (Ed.). (1977). Chaim Weizmann to Arthur Balfour, The Letters and Papers of Chaim Weizmann. Series A, Volume VIII. Israel University Press.

External links
Text of the Faisal-Weizmann agreement, full text, reference document, United Nations
Text of the agreement and accompanying letters, agreement and collection of selected correspondence, archived at archive.org.
The story behind the forgotten agreement 

History of Zionism
Arab nationalism in the Ottoman Empire
Borders of Syria
Borders of Israel
Treaties concluded in 1919
Documents of Mandatory Palestine
1919 in British-administered Palestine
1919 in Mandatory Syria
1910s in Islam